Mohsen "Pendar" Pezeshkpour (1927 – 6 January 2011) was an Iranian pan-Iranist politician who served as a member of the parliament from 1967 to 1971, and 1975 to 1979. He was the co-founder and leader of the Pan-Iranist Party.

References 

1920s births
2011 deaths
Pan-Iranist Party politicians
Rastakhiz Party politicians
University of Tehran alumni
20th-century Iranian lawyers
People from Tehran
Leaders of political parties in Iran

Iranian nationalists
Members of the 22nd Iranian Majlis
Members of the 24th Iranian Majlis